Donald Michael "Don" Keane (12 November 1930 – 10 November 2016) was an Australian racewalker who competed in the 1952 Summer Olympics, ranking 10th in the men's 10K walk, and in the 1956 Summer Olympics, ranking 6th in the men's 20K walk.

References

External links 
 
 
 

1930 births
2016 deaths
Australian male racewalkers
Olympic athletes of Australia
Athletes (track and field) at the 1952 Summer Olympics
Athletes (track and field) at the 1956 Summer Olympics